Hamish McLeod is a former Zambian cricketer, who played for East Africa in the 1975 Cricket World Cup.

A wicket-keeper, McLeod appeared in two One Day Internationals, against New Zealand and England, scoring five and nought respectively and taking no catches or completing any stumpings.

During Glamorgan's 1972–73 tour of Zambia, McLeod played a three-day match for Zambia against Glamorgan and a two-day match for Glamorgan against an invitational side.

References

  Prudential World Cup, 1975 fixtures and results
 Hamish McLeod profile at CricketArchive
 Hamish McLeod Details at ZambiaCricket.Org

East African cricketers
East Africa One Day International cricketers
Cricketers at the 1975 Cricket World Cup
Living people
Year of birth missing (living people)
Zambian cricketers
Wicket-keepers